The Teignmouth Open or Teignmouth and Shaldon Open Tournament was combined men's and women's grass court or sometimes hard court tennis tournament founded in 1880 that ran until 1939. It was staged by the Teignmouth Lawn Tennis Club at  Teignmouth, Devon, England through until 1939 when it was abolished.

History
Officially known as the Teignmouth and Shaldon Open Tournament was a combined men's and women's grass court tennis tournament first staged in September 1880 at Lower Bitton, Teignmouth, Devon, England. During the 1880s it was a featured event of Pastime's five week end of summer 'Western Tour' taking in Exmouth, Teignmouth, Torquay, Bournemouth and Eastbourne. It was staged by the Teignmouth Lawn Tennis Club at Teignmouth, Devon, England through until 1939 when it was abolished.

Former winners of the men's singles included: Ernest Wool Lewis, Herbert Chipp, Manliffe Goodbody, William Renshaw, Wilberforce Eaves, Harry  Grove, Harry Sibthorpe Barlow, Les Poidevin and Henry Billington. Previous women's singles title winners included: Maud Watson,Violet Pinckney, Alice Pickering, Kathleen Lidderdale, and Madge Slaney.

Venue
Teignmouth Lawn Tennis Club: (1880-1939) The modern day Teignmouth Tennis Club forms part of a specialised Tennis Academy located at the Trinity School, Teignmouth.

Surfaces
The tournament was played predominantly on grass courts except for the 1882 to 1884 editions when it was played on hard asphalt courts.

References

Defunct tennis tournaments in the United Kingdom
Grass court tennis tournaments